Pramsiri Bunphithak (born January 13, 1984, in Suphan Buri Province) is a Thai weightlifter. She won the gold medal for the 48 kg class at the 2009 Southeast Asian Games in Vientiane, Laos, and silver at the 2007 World Weightlifting Championships in Chiang Mai, Thailand, with a total of 194 and 196 kg, respectively.

Bunphithak represented Thailand at the 2008 Summer Olympics in Beijing, where she competed for the women's flyweight category (48 kg), along with her teammate Pensiri Laosirikul. Bunphithak, however, did not finish the event, after failing to lift a single-motion snatch of 84 kg in three attempts.

References

External links
NBC 2008 Olympics profile

Pramsiri Bunphithak
1984 births
Living people
Pramsiri Bunphithak
Weightlifters at the 2008 Summer Olympics
Pramsiri Bunphithak
Weightlifters at the 2010 Asian Games
Universiade medalists in weightlifting
Pramsiri Bunphithak
Southeast Asian Games medalists in weightlifting
Competitors at the 2009 Southeast Asian Games
Universiade bronze medalists for Thailand
Pramsiri Bunphithak
World Weightlifting Championships medalists
Medalists at the 2011 Summer Universiade
Pramsiri Bunphithak
Pramsiri Bunphithak